Thomas Kirkman was a mathematician and church minister.

Thomas Kirkman may also refer to:

Thomas Kirkman, fictional character in Fable: The Balverine Order
Tom Kirkman, fictional President of the United States in Designated Survivor